Joan II, Countess of Burgundy (c. 1287/88 – 21 January 1330), was Queen of France by marriage to Philip V of France; she was also ruling Countess of Burgundy from 1303 to 1330 and ruling Countess of Artois in 1329-1330.

Biography
 
Joan, born c.1287/88, was the eldest daughter and heiress of Otto IV, Count of Burgundy, and Mahaut, Countess of Artois. She married Philip, the second son of King Philip IV of France, on 21 January 1307. At the beginning of 1314, Joan's sister Blanche and her sister-in-law Margaret were convicted of adultery with two knights, upon the testimony of their sister-in-law Isabella, in the Tour de Nesle affair. Joan was thought to have known of the affairs, and was placed under house arrest at Dourdan as punishment. She was cleared, by parliament, and released following the death of King Philip IV.

Queen
With the death of King John I of France in 1316, Joan's husband became King Philip V of France and she became queen consort.

Countess of Burgundy and Artois
Upon her father's death in 1303, with her only brother Robert disinherited by the Treaty of Vincennes (1295), the County of Burgundy was inherited by Joan under the regency of her mother. When she married in 1307, her mother continued to govern her domains for her during her absence.  

After her husband's death in 1322, Joan lived in her own domains. After Joan's beloved sister, Blanche, died in 1326, she was said to be "so sorrowful as never before she had been."

In 1329, she inherited her mother's County of Artois.

Death
Joan died at Roye-en-Artois, on 21 January 1330, and was buried at Cordeliers Convent in Paris. Her titles were inherited by her eldest daughter, Joan III, who had married Odo IV, Duke of Burgundy, in 1318. With Joan II's death, the County and Duchy of Burgundy became united through this marriage. The Counties of Burgundy and Artois were eventually inherited by her younger daughter Margaret in 1361.

Joan left provision in her will for the founding of a college in Paris; it was named Collège de Bourgogne, "Burgundy College."

Issue

Joan and Philip had:
 Joan (1/2 May 1308 – 10/15 August 1349), Countess of Burgundy and Artois in her own right and wife of Odo IV, Duke of Burgundy
 Margaret (1309 – 9 May 1382), wife of Louis I of Flanders
 Isabelle (1310 – April 1348), wife of Guigues VIII de La Tour du Pin, Dauphin de Viennois.
 Blanche (1313 – 26 April 1358), a nun
 Louis (d. 1317)

In fiction
Joan (as Jeanne) is a character in Les Rois maudits (The Accursed Kings), a series of French historical novels by Maurice Druon. She was portrayed by Catherine Rich in the 1972 French miniseries adaptation of the series, and by Julie Depardieu in the 2005 adaptation.

See also

 Joan of Burgundy (disambiguation)

Notes

References

Sources

|-

|-

1291 births
1330 deaths

Year of birth uncertain
Joan
Counts of Burgundy
Joan II
Navarrese royal consorts
French queens consort
Burgundy, Countess of, Joan II
Place of birth missing
14th-century peers of France
14th-century women rulers
13th-century French people
13th-century French women
14th-century French people
14th-century French women
Burials at the Basilica of Saint-Denis